Bangladesh Fisheries Research Institute is an autonomous government research institution for fisheries and related research. The present Director General of the institution is Yahia Mahmud.

History
The institution was founded in 1984 and started functioning from 1986. In Mymensingh the headquarters are located. the institution manages a number of specialized research stations. They are Riverine Station located in Chandpur, Freshwater Station located in Mymensingh, Brackishwater Station located in Khulna, and Marine Fisheries and Technological Station in Cox's Bazar. Two smaller stations are for reservoir fisheries in Rangamati and floodplain ecosystem in Santahar.  A Chief Scientific Officer is in charge of each station.

Awards 
  Ekushey Padak -  2020 for research.

References

1984 establishments in Bangladesh
Organisations based in Mymensingh
Research institutes in Bangladesh
Government agencies of Bangladesh
Fisheries and aquaculture research institutes
Fishing in Bangladesh